No Babies Wanted is a 1928 silent film domestic drama directed by Jack Harvey, released under the alternative title The Baby Mother. It starred child actress Priscilla Moran (b. 1917) and seasoned silent veteran William V. Mong as her grandfather. It is preserved at the Library of Congress.

Cast
Priscilla Moran - Patsy O'Day
William V. Mong - Michael O'Day
Dorothy Devore - Martha Whitney
Emily Fitzroy - Landlady, 'Old Ironsides'
Cissy Fitzgerald - Woman from Orphanage
John Richard Butler - The Baby

References

External links
No Babies Wanted at IMDb.com
allmovie/synopsis

1928 films
American silent feature films
1928 drama films
Silent American drama films
Films directed by Jack Harvey
American black-and-white films
1920s American films